Hong Kong Time (abbreviation: HKT) is the time in Hong Kong, observed at UTC+08:00 all year round. The Hong Kong Observatory is the official timekeeper of the Hong Kong Time. It is indicated as Asia/Hong_Kong in the IANA time zone database.

Time standards
In Hong Kong, Hong Kong Time is defined in the Interpretation and General Clauses Ordinance (Cap 1), Laws of Hong Kong.

Section 67(2) of the Ordinance states that:

"Hong Kong Time" means the time used for general purposes throughout Hong Kong namely, 8 hours, or such other period as may be determined by the Legislative Council by resolution under this subsection or under section 16 of the Oil (Conservation and Control) Ordinance (Cap 264), in advance of Universal Standard Time.

Currently, Hong Kong time is defined as UTC+08:00. The reference in section 67(2) to the Oil (Conservation and Control) Ordinance is actually a power given to the Legislative Council of Hong Kong to change Hong Kong Time for the purposes of conserving oil, i.e. to implement daylight saving time. However, no daylight saving time has been observed since 1979.

The Hong Kong Time was first set to Local Mean Time (GMT+07:36:42) on 1 January 1885 at 13:00 by the then Royal Observatory Hong Kong. In 1904, the Greenwich Mean Time was adopted as the basis for Hong Kong Time, the time was set at 8 hours in advance of Greenwich Mean Time. The current Coordinated Universal Time system was adopted as an official time standard on 1 January 1972. However, the legal Hong Kong Time still remained based on Greenwich Mean Time until it was changed to Universal Standard Time in 1998 after the Hong Kong handover.

Timekeeping
From 1885, Hong Kong Time was determined by astronomical observations at the Hong Kong Observatory using a 6-inch equatorial mount and a 3-inch Transit Circle.  The time was announced to the general public, particularly mariners, by dropping a 6-feet diameter time ball from a mast exactly at 13:00 daily in front the Marine Police Headquarters Compound, where it is visible from the Victoria Harbour. In January 1908, the time ball was relocated to the hill of Blackhead Point where it had even higher visibility. With the rise of radio broadcast and the launching of Radio Hong Kong in 1922, the importance of the time ball decreased.  It was decommissioned on 30 June 1933.

During the Second World War, the equatorial mount and transit circle were lost. After the war, a pendulum clock was installed and regulated by radio time signals from other timekeeping centres. Timing accuracy gradually improved from the daily engineering tolerance of a few seconds to one-fifth of a second.

In 1966, the pendulum clock in the Royal Observatory Hong Kong was replaced by a crystal oscillator timing system. In the same year, the Royal Observatory started to broadcast the time directly with a 6-pip time signal on 95 MHz. This continued until 16 September 1989.

In 1980, the Royal Observatory adopted a timing system based on a Caesium beam atomic clock.  This system narrowed the engineering tolerance down to less than 1 millisecond. The frequency standard of the clock is based on the primary standard used by Japan's Communications Research Laboratory. In 1994, the atomic clock was replaced with a newer model.

Current Hong Kong Time can be obtained from the Observatory's Network Time Server .

Daylight Saving

Hong Kong adopted daylight saving measures in 1941. However, the practice eventually declined in popularity and was eliminated after 1979.

Time zone serial
Asia/Hong_Kong

See also
UTC+08:00
ASEAN Common Time
tz database

References

External links
Hong Kong Observatory
Hong Kong Time by Hong Kong Observatory 
Hong Kong Summer Time in history
History of Hong Kong Time service 
IANA time zone database
PHP time zones Asia

Geography of Hong Kong
Time zones
Time in China